The City of Los Angeles Park Ranger Division is a Park Ranger division serving the City of Los Angeles, California parks. The headquarters of the City of Los Angeles Park Rangers is located at the Griffith Park visitor's center. The division is a specialized agency controlled by the Department of Parks and Recreation and employs 22 Park Rangers who are sworn peace officers under 830.31 of the California Penal Code.

Overview
The City of Los Angeles Park Rangers provides public assistance and emergency services in Los Angeles City parks, including first aid, park policing, search and rescue, and are trained wildland firefighters. They have various responsibilities in public parks and provide not only emergency and public safety services but also informational services at several parks. Park rangers receive law enforcement training and have certified peace officer status in California. All Park Rangers are required to obtain a Basic P.O.S.T certificate to remain employed.  Park Rangers attend the Los Angeles Police Department's academy.  The Ranger Division is a participating agency in P.O.S.T which sets the standards of training for peace officers.  In 1996 due to spikes in violent crime in city parks patrolled by the Rangers, the union representing the rangers requested that the Rangers be trained to carry semi-automatic handguns similar to the police but the request was eventually denied due to opposition from the LAPD and the Parks Department.  In 2000 the Parks and Recreation Department and the LAPD attempted to change the duties of the Park rangers by signing an agreement that would make the LAPD responsible for all arrests made in city parks and that Rangers would only be allowed to make arrests if someone's life was in danger. After strong opposition from the Park rangers, the city council eventually rejected the proposed agreement and Park rangers continued with their original peace officer status.

Park Rangers wear gray uniform shirts and forest green pants, with a gold-colored metal oval shield badge.  Security Officers assigned to the Park Ranger division wear similar shirts with dark brown pants. They are issued a gold-colored metal "pinched shield" eagle-top badge, a design used by many other city departments.  Both classifications wear straw campaign hat-style ranger hats.

See also 

 List of law enforcement agencies in California
 Los Angeles Police Department
 Law enforcement in Los Angeles County

References

External links
Los Angeles Park Ranger Division

Government of Los Angeles
Specialist police departments of California
Park police departments of the United States